Kavish Majumdar is a former Indian actor who appears in Hindi-language films.

Career 
Kavish Majumdar made his film debut with Kabhi Khushi Kabhie Gham... (2001) as a child artiste. In the film, he played Laddoo, the younger version of Hrithik Roshan and Shah Rukh Khan's plump brother. While in college, he made short films and worked as an assistant director to Soham Shah for Luck (2009). He returned to acting with Gori Tere Pyaar Mein (2013) and later starred in Main Tera Hero (2014).

Filmography 
All films are in Hindi.

References

External links 

Living people
Place of birth missing (living people)
Indian film actors
21st-century Indian actors
Indian male child actors
Year of birth missing (living people)